Silvio Nicoladelli (born 7 September 1971 in Orleans, Santa Catarina), known as Sílvio Criciúma, is a Brazilian professional football coach and former player who played as a defender. He is the current head coach of Goianésia.

Honours

Club honours
 Criciúma
 Campeonato Catarinense: 1991, 1993, 1995
 Copa do Brasil: 1991
 Campeonato Brasileiro Série C: 2006

 Goiás
 Campeonato Goiano: 1998, 1999, 2000
 Campeonato Brasileiro Série B: 1999
 Copa Centro-Oeste: 2000, 2001

Club manager
 Goiás
 Campeonato Goiano: 2017

External links

1971 births
Living people
Brazilian footballers
Brazilian football managers
Association football defenders
Campeonato Brasileiro Série A players
Campeonato Brasileiro Série B players
Campeonato Brasileiro Série A managers
Campeonato Brasileiro Série B managers
Campeonato Brasileiro Série C managers
Campeonato Brasileiro Série D managers
Criciúma Esporte Clube players
Figueirense FC players
Goiás Esporte Clube players
Associação Portuguesa de Desportos players
Club Athletico Paranaense players
Esporte Clube Santo André players
Sport Club do Recife players
Criciúma Esporte Clube managers
Clube Atlético Hermann Aichinger managers
Associação Atlética Aparecidense managers
Associação Atlética Anapolina managers
Goiás Esporte Clube managers
Itumbiara Esporte Clube managers
Grêmio Esportivo Anápolis managers
Central Sport Club managers
ABC Futebol Clube managers
Paraná Clube managers
Salgueiro Atlético Clube managers
Goianésia Esporte Clube managers